The Arizona Silver Belt is a newspaper in Globe, Arizona. It has been published since May 2, 1878. It is owned by News Media Corporation, who acquired it from GateHouse Media in 2008.

In 1906, editor Joseph H. Hamill increased publication to a daily newspaper and changed the title to the Daily Arizona Silver Belt. The title was later changed back to the Arizona Silver Belt.

References

External links
 Official website

Newspapers published in Arizona